Events from the year 1985 in Michigan.

Top Michigan news stories
The Associated Press (AP) selected the state's top news stories as follows:

1. The enactment of a state law, effective July 1, 1985, requiring all drivers of motor vehicles and front-seat passengers to wear seat belts.
Opponents viewed the law as excessive government intrusion.
2. National competition for construction of a high tech, $3.5 billion plant to build automobiles for General Motors' new Saturn division. In August, GM announced that the plant would be built in Spring Hill, Tennessee.
3. The state government's return to financial solvency. Gov. James Blanchard declared "Solvency Day" on November 8 when the state repaid its $1.8 billion debt.
4. The rapid increase in premiums for liability insurance for doctors, truckers, lawyers, tavern keepers, and others.
5. A late summer sales boom for automobiles, following a Teamsters strike that limited supplies to automobile pants and further fueled by a price war in late August and September that included rebates and low interest rates on car loans.
6. An ice storm that struck the state on New Year's Day and cut off electricity to 370,000 customers.
7. The arrest of 26-year-old Ronald Bailey of Livonia for the abduction and murder of two young boys, ages 13 and 14, and the kidnapping and sexual assault of another youth.
8. A late summer storm that resulted in record flooding in Flint, causing $10 million in damages.
9. A decline in the state's unemployment rate to 9.3% in March, the first time in five years that the rate had dropped below 10%.
10. The Michigan State Police's seizure of three children living in a dilapidated bus near Niles, Michigan. The parents, Donald and Eva Monk, were tried and acquitted of child cruelty and subsequently filed a lawsuit against the state over the removal of their children.

The AP also selected the state's top sports stories as follows:

1. After finishing with a 6–6 record in 1984, the 1985 Michigan Wolverines football team led by quarterback Jim Harbaugh finished the season with a 10–1–1 record, defeated Nebraska in the Fiesta Bowl, and was ranked No. 2 in the AP Poll.
2. The hiring of Darryl Rogers as head coach of the Detroit Lions, following the firing of Monte Clark.
3. Michigan State sophomore running back Lorenzo White led the NCAA with 1,908 rushing yards and finished third in voting for the Heisman Trophy.
4. The 1984–85 Michigan Wolverines men's basketball team led by Roy Tarpley and Antoine Joubert compiled a 26–4 record, won the Big Ten championship, and were ranked No. 2 in the AP and coaches' polls released at the end of the regular season.
5. The 1985 Detroit Tigers season in which the team finished third in the American League East, 15 games behind the Toronto Blue Jays.
6. Kirk Gibson's declaration of free agency after the 1985 season and contract negotiations between Gibson and the Tigers.
7. The U.S. Open golf championship at Oakland Hills Country Club, ending with Andy North as champion after a final-round collapse by T.C. Chen.
8. Darrell Evans, at age 38, leading the American League with 40 home runs.
9. The Detroit Red Wings' signing of Czechoslovakian hockey star, Petr Klíma.
10. Marvin Hagler vs. Thomas Hearns - The April 15 boxing match in Las Vegas between the "Motor City Cobra" Thomas Hearns and Marvelous Marvin Hagler, ending in a technical knockout of Hearns in the third round.

Office holders

State office holders

 Governor of Michigan: James Blanchard (Democrat)
 Lieutenant Governor of Michigan: Martha Griffiths (Democrat) 
 Michigan Attorney General: Frank J. Kelley (Democrat)
 Michigan Secretary of State: Richard H. Austin (Democrat)
 Speaker of the Michigan House of Representatives: Gary Owen (Democrat)
 Majority Leader of the Michigan Senate: John Engler (Republican)
 Chief Justice, Michigan Supreme Court:

Mayors of major cities
 Mayor of Detroit: Coleman Young
 Mayor of Grand Rapids: Gerald R. Helmholdt
 Mayor of Flint: James A. Sharp, Jr.
 Mayor of Lansing: Terry John McKane
 Mayor of Ann Arbor: Louis Belcher (Republican)/Edward C. Pierce (Democrat)

Federal office holders

 U.S. Senator from Michigan: Donald W. Riegle Jr. (Democrat)
 U.S. Senator from Michigan: Carl Levin (Democrat) 
 House District 1: John Conyers (Democrat)
 House District 2: Carl Pursell (Republican)
 House District 3: Howard Wolpe (Republican)
 House District 4: Mark D. Siljander (Republican)
 House District 5: Harold S. Sawyer (Republican)
 House District 6: Bob Carr (Democrat)
 House District 7: Dale Kildee (Democrat)
 House District 8: J. Bob Traxler (Democrat)
 House District 9: Guy Vander Jagt (Republican)
 House District 10: Bill Schuette (Republican)
 House District 11: Robert William Davis (Republican)
 House District 12: David Bonior (Democrat)
 House District 13: George Crockett Jr. (Democrat)
 House District 14: Dennis M. Hertel (Democrat)
 House District 15: William D. Ford (Democrat)
 House District 16: John Dingell (Democrat)
 House District 17: Sander Levin (Democrat)
 House District 18: William Broomfield (Republican)

Population

Sports

Baseball
 1985 Detroit Tigers season – Under manager Sparky Anderson, the Tigers compiled an 84-77 record and finished third in American League East. The team's statistical leaders included Kirk Gibson with a .287 batting average, Darrell Evans with 40 home runs, Lance Parrish with 98 RBIs, Jack Morris with 16 wins, and Willie Hernandez with a 2.70 earned run average.

American football
 1985 Detroit Lions season – Under head coach Darryl Rogers, the Lions compiled a 7-9 record and finished fourth in the NFC Central Division. The team's statistical leaders included Eric Hipple with 2,952 passing yards, James Jones with 886 rushing yards, Leonard Thompson with 736 receiving yards, and Eddie Murray with 109 points scored.
 1985 Michigan Wolverines football team – After finishing with a 6–6 record in 1984, the 1985 Michigan Wolverines football team finished the season with a 10–1–1 record, defeated Nebraska in the Fiesta Bowl, and was ranked No. 2 in the AP Poll. The team's statistical leaders included Jim Harbaugh with 1,976 passing yards, Jamie Morris with 1,030 rushing yards, Paul Jokisch with 681 receiving yards, and Mike Gillette with 78 points scored.

Basketball
 1984–85 Detroit Pistons season – Under head coach Chuck Daly, the Pistons compiled a 46-36 record and finished second in the NBA's Central Division. The team's statistical leaders included Isaiah Thomas with 1,720 points and 1,123 assists and Bill Laimbeer with 1,013 rebounds.

Ice hockey
 1984–85 Detroit Red Wings season – Under head coach Nick Polano, the Red Wings compiled a 31-42-7 record and finished third in the NHL Norris Division. The team's statistical leaders included John Ogrodnick with 55 goals and 105 points and Steve Yzerman with 59 assists. The team's regular goaltenders were Greg Stefan (46 games) and Corrado Micalef (36 games).

Boxing
 April 15 - Marvin Hagler vs. Thomas Hearns

Other

Music and culture
 January 1985 - Madonna's song "Material Girl" was released as a single and reached No. 2 on the Billboard Hot 100.
 February 1985 - The film Vision Quest was released; it featured Madonna playing a singer at a local bar, where she performs the songs "Crazy for You" and "Gambler". 
 March 1985 - Madonna's song "Crazy for You" was released as a single and reached No. 1 on the Billboard Hot 100.
 March 1985 - The film Desperately Seeking Susan starring Madonna in the title role was released
 April 1985 - Madonna's song "Angel" was released as a single and reached No. 5 on the Billboard Hot 100.
 July 1985 - Aretha Franklin's album Who's Zoomin' Who? was released and went platinum. The single "Freeway of Love" reached No. 3 on the Billboard Hot 100 and won the Grammy for Best Female R&B Vocal Performance.
 July 1985 - The film Silverado written and directed by University of Michigan alumnus Lawrence Kasdan was released.
 July 1985 - Madonna's song "Into the Groove" was released. Ineligible for the Billboard Hot 100, it was later honored by Billboard magazine as the Dance Single of the Decade.
 July 1985 - Madonna's song "Dress You Up" was released as a single and reached No. 5 on the Billboard Hot 100.
 September 1985 - Stevie Wonder's album In Square Circle was released and spent 12 weeks at No. 1 on the Top R&B Albums chart. The single "Part-Time Lover" reached No. 1 on the Billboard Hot 100.
 September 1985 - Diana Ross' album Eaten Alive was released and reached No. 45 on the album chart.

Chronology of events

January

February

March

April

May

June

July

August

September

October

November

December

Births
 May 9 - Jake Long
 July 2 - Chad Henne

Gallery of 1985 births

Deaths
 April 23 - Whitey Wistert
 October 3 - Charles Collingwood
 September 10 - Ebbie Goodfellow
 December 14 - Charlie Bachman

Gallery of 1985 deaths

See also
 History of Michigan
 History of Detroit

References